Castra of Sânpaul may refer to:
Castra of Sânpaul (Harghita), a fort in Dacia
Castra of Sânpaul (Mureș), a fort in Dacia